Eustace Ingram (6 August 1839 – 10 December 1924) was a British organ builder based in London.

Early life and work

He was born in 1839 and  apprenticed to Robert Snell until 1860 when he was articled to Henry Willis to learn reed-voicing. 

He established his own business and was in partnership with Henry Speechly from 1873 for a short period. In 1894 he acquired the business of George Holdich and for a short period the firm traded as Holdich & Ingram until it was taken over by Gray and Davison.

References

1839 births
1924 deaths
British pipe organ builders
Organ builders of the United Kingdom
Music in London